The Agbar Group is a benchmark in the complete water cycle and environmental management sector. It started out as Aigües de Barcelona and as of 2022 is part of the Veolia Group.

With more than 150 years' experience, Agbar currently has over 15,000 employees and is committed to the digital transformation of water and environmental management. Its more than 900 industrial facilities and the 37 million people it supplies in Spain and Latin America make Agbar one of the industry's main references.

History 
The history of the group dates back to 1867, when the "Compagnie des Eaux de Barcelone" was founded in Liège to supply water to towns near Barcelona, today neighbourhoods in the city, through the Dosrius aqueduct. The company was acquired by French and later Catalan investors. The latter changed the company's name to "Sociedad General de Aguas de Barcelona" in 1919.

The Agbar Group was established in 1975, covering economic sectors as diverse as drinking water supply, sanitation and construction. Subsequently, its activities were expanded to the fields of healthcare, technical vehicle inspection and tax collection.

In 2008, Agbar ceased to be listed on the Spanish stock market and on the IBEX 35, following the joint takeover bid by the French group Suez (holding 56%) and Criteria Caixa, the CaixaBank investment group and former majority shareholder (with the remaining 44%). In 2010, Agbar became a subsidiary of Hisusa (Holding de Infraestructuras y Servicios Urbanos, S.A.), with Suez Environnement holding 75.74% of this holding company and Criteria Caixa  24.26%. During the transaction, Agbar divested itself of its shares in Adeslas. In 2014, Suez Environnement (renamed Suez in 2015) acquired 100% of Agbar, after signing an agreement with Criteria Caixa for the sale of its 24.26%, in exchange for a 4.1% stake in the French group's capital. Agbar became one of the subsidiaries of Suez Spain for complete water cycle management.

At the start of 2022, the Veolia Group, active in water and waste management and energy services, launched a takeover bid for Suez, taking control of 86.22% of its shareholding, a percentage that would be increased to 95.95% after the closing of its complementary offer to acquire the shares that had not participated in its initial takeover bid.

See also 

 Veolia
 Torre Agbar

References

External links
Official website

Public utilities of Spain
Construction and civil engineering companies of Spain
Construction and civil engineering companies established in 1867
1867 establishments in Spain